Paper spray ionization is a technique used in mass spectrometry to produce ions from a sample to be analyzed. It is a variant of electrospray ionization. The sample (for instance a few microlitres of blood or urine) is applied to a piece of paper and solvent is added. Then a high voltage is applied, which creates the ions to be analyzed with a mass spectrometer. The method, first described in 2010, is relatively easy to use and can detect and measure the presence of various substances in the sample. This technique shows great potential for point-of-care clinical applications, in that important tests may be run and results obtained within a reasonable amount of time in proximity to the patient in a single visit.

In 2017 it was reported that a test based on paper spray ionization mass spectrometry can detect cocaine use from a subject's fingerprint.  It was also used to detect pesticides from the surfaces of fruits.

References 

Ion source